Kondratowicza is a station on the north-eastern part of Line M2 (Warsaw Metro). It is located in the vicinity of Ludwika Kondratowicza, Malborska, 20 Dywizji Piechoty Wojska Polskiego and Aleksandra Kowalskiego streets. The station is located by the Masovian Bródno District Hospital (Mazowiecki Szpital Bródnowski).

Description 

The construction of the station began in 2019.

The planned opening of the station is in 2022.

The station was opened for passenger services on 28 September 2022.

References 

Railway stations in Poland opened in 2022
Line 2 (Warsaw Metro) stations